Serhii Volodymyrovych Shakhov (born 7 May 1975)  is a Ukrainian politician. He is a People's Deputy of Ukraine of the 8th Ukrainian Verkhovna Rada.

Biography
The family dates back to Luhansk Oblast. In 1976 the family moved to a stable place of living to Stakhanov city.
Higher Education: Law. In 2011 got a diploma of the Master of in Law Academy, Ukraine, after Yaroslav the Wise.
He is a founder of Stakhanov city Public Organization «Dobrodiy» which gives charity help to boarding schools, secondary schools and gymnasiums, pre-school organizations, hospitals, sports societies.
In 2011 was awarded for high professionalism by All-Ukraine Charity Organization «Ukrainian Cultural Fund».

Political Activity 
In March 2006 was elected a deputy of Luhansk Oblast Council of the Vth convocation (fixed region Stakhanov).
Since December 8, 2010 he is a member of executive committee of Stakhanov city Council. 
In 2012 he headed his team at the elections to the Verkhovna Rada of Ukraine. Nonparty man.
In 2012 because of the speech against the Party of Regions the authorities brought criminal cases to the court and he is being searched.

Leader and a founder of public organization People’s Belief.
He initiated to around tables on the topic "How to unite the country". 15 round tables have already been arranged successfully in the cities of Ukraine.
He helps Ukrainian military men and frontiersmen with ammunition: body armor, steel pots, night vision devices, cars. He gives financial aid to the free-will battalion of Ukrainian National Army. He participates in organization of Donetsk and Luhansk citizens’ temporary relocation to Western regions of the country and to Odessa. Volunteers of People’s Belief organized the settling of more than 200 families.
S. Shakhov managed to save a pilot's life who participated in military actions in War in Donbass zone. On August 17 battle-plain was attacked by the terrorists’ rocket in Samsonivka Region. Moreover, Sergey Shakhov actively worries about the wounded soldiers. He actively takes care of the wounded soldiers who are in hospital and are being cared for in Kyiv Central Military Hospital.

Shakhov became in 2016 a people's deputy of Ukraine after winning a 2014 Ukrainian parliamentary election by-election of constituency No. 114 located in Luhansk Oblast. The date when he got his deputy's power is September, 2016. Post: the member of the Committee of the Verkhovna Rada of Ukraine procedure and the  work of the Verkhovna Rada organization. 
February 17, 2016 – the deputy of the Verkhovna Rada Shakhov became the member of deputy group «People's Will».

In the 2019 Ukrainian parliamentary election (as an independent candidate, although he was a member of the party Our Land at the time) again won constituency No. 114, this time with 43.17%, which was 20,605 votes (the voter turnout in the constituency was 46.26%).

Shakhov was a candidate for Mayor of Kyiv for the party Our Land in the 2020 Kyiv local election. He finished in 15th place with 1.608 votes.

References

External links
 Sergey Shakhov's official page on the social network Facebook
 Shakhov Sergey Vladimirovich declaration of income for 2015
 Biography of Sergei Shakhov on the site of the publication "Left Bank"
 Profile of Sergey Shakhov on the site “Word and deed
 Stanislav Kmet. Stakhanov People's Republic
 Dossier of the People's Deputy of Ukraine of the VIII convocation Sergey Vladimirovich Shakhov on the official website of the Verkhovna Rada

External links

1975 births
Living people
21st-century Ukrainian businesspeople
21st-century Ukrainian politicians
People from Karaganda Region
People from Stakhanov, Ukraine
Yaroslav Mudryi National Law University alumni
Our Land (Ukraine) politicians
Eighth convocation members of the Verkhovna Rada
Ninth convocation members of the Verkhovna Rada